La Cruz District may refer to:

 La Cruz District, Tumbes, in Tumbes province, Tumbes region, Peru
 La Cruz District, La Cruz, in La Cruz Canton, Guanacaste province, Costa Rica